Gerard A. Kosinski is a former Democratic member of the Pennsylvania House of Representatives.

He is a member of the American Polish Advisory Council and has received a number of awards from American Polonia.

References

Democratic Party members of the Pennsylvania House of Representatives
1954 births
Living people
Politicians from Philadelphia